Romanis Pontificibus is a papal decree, issued on 6 June 1975 by Pope Paul VI, that concerns the Herzegovina Affair: the Franciscan friars of Herzegovina took control of the local parishes and refused to hand them over to the local bishops and priests, despite the Franciscan vow of obedience. The decree specified the relative jurisdictions of the friars and the diocesan clergy.

Historical precedent
In July 1881 Pope Leo XIII, by the apostolic constitution Ex hac augusta, established the ecclesiastical province of Vrhbosna, which also contained Herzegovina, and appointed a residential bishop for the diocese of Mostar, to which he joined the ancient title of Duvno. Paul VI references Leo's Romanos Pontifices, an apostolic constitution of May 1881 which defined the relationship between bishops and members of religious institutes.

Paul VI quoted Ad gentes, the Second Vatican Council's decree regarding missionary activity.It is the bishop's role, as the ruler and center of unity in the diocesan apostolate, to promote missionary activity, to direct it and to coordinate it but always in such a way that the zeal and spontaneity of those who share in the work may be preserved and fostered. All missionaries, even exempt Religious, are subject to his power in the various works which refer to the exercise of the sacred apostolate. 

It is the responsibility of the local Ordinary to provide for the governance of parishes, while moderators of religious institutes are encouraged to offer their assistance to bishops, even by taking up, for a time, the care of parishes.

Terms
After consultation with Sacred Congregation for the Evangelization of Peoples or Propagation of Faith, the Pope decreed that "in consideration of the merits which the Friars Minor of the Province of Herzegovina have secured for themselves, the Holy See accepts that it be taken as a general rule that half of the faithful of the diocese of Mostar-Duvno remain entrusted to the pastoral care of the same religious, while the other half entrusted to diocesan clergy."

Pastoral care of the parishes in Izbično, Klobuk, and Kongora was entrusted to the Friars Minor of the Province of Herzegovina, but they were required to turn over to the diocesan clergy the parishes of Blagaj, Jablanica, Ploče, and Nevesinje. Additional arrangements were made regarding other parishes.

To facilitate the transition the Sacred Congregation for the Evangelization of Peoples or Propagation of the Faith established as executors Peter Čule, bishop of Mostar-Duvno, coadjutor bishop Pavao Žanić and Father Constantine Koser, minister general of the Order of Friars Minor. It also confirmed Stephan László, bishop of Eisenstadt, as Apostolic visitor to Herzegovina, assisted by Vladimir Vlašić, S.J., rector of the interdiocesan minor seminary of Zagreb.

In 1990, Bishop Ratko Perić complained about an alleged Marian apparition in Medjugorje, called Our Lady of Medjugorje, that was telling people the Franciscan friars could stay in Medjugorje because they were innocent. Fr. Tomislav Vlasic, whom Peric has claimed is behind the apparition, was found guilty of disobedience and sexual misconduct.

Implementation
In February 1999, the vicar general of the order and Bishop Peric met in Mostar. The Holy See was represented by the Nunciature acting Charg d’Affaires. The seven parishes listed in the decree were formally turned over to the diocese with the friars staffing them re-assigned to other houses in the province effective February 22. However the parties noted that it was not possible for diocesan clergy to immediately assume their assignments due to "...acts of organised physical resistance, serious written and verbal threats, occupation of parochial Churches and houses, removal of parish registers and stamps." In order to assure a continuation of pastoral care in the interim, the Bishop referred parishioners temporarily to other parishes in the area.

References

Catholic Church in Bosnia and Herzegovina
Pope Paul VI